Uppingham was a rural district in Rutland, England from 1894 to 1974, covering the south of the county.  

The rural district was formed by the Local Government Act 1894 from the part of the Uppingham rural sanitary district in Rutland. At the same time, the remainder of Uppingham RSD, which lay in Leicestershire and Northamptonshire became Hallaton Rural District and Gretton Rural District respectively.

The only town in the district was Uppingham. 

The rural district was abolished in 1974 by the Local Government Act 1972. Uppingham RD was merged with three other authorities to become the non-metropolitan district of Rutland.

Parishes
The rural district consisted of twenty civil parishes:
Ayston
Barrowden
Beaumont Chase
Belton
Bisbrooke
Caldecott
Glaston
Lyddington
North Luffenham
Morcott
Pilton
Preston
Ridlington
Seaton
South Luffenham
Stoke Dry
Thorpe by Water
Uppingham
Wardley
Wing

References

Districts of England created by the Local Government Act 1894
Districts of England abolished by the Local Government Act 1972
History of Rutland
Local government in Rutland
Rural districts of England
Uppingham